Križan Vrh is a settlement in the Municipality of Bistrica ob Sotli in eastern Slovenia. The area is part of the traditional region of Styria. It is now included in the Lower Sava Statistical Region; until January 2014 it was part of the Savinja Statistical Region.

The hamlet of Trebeže in the settlement with its traditional mid–19th-century farmhouses, barns, and outbuildings has been protected as a national heritage site by the Slovenian Ministry of Culture.

References

External links
Križan Vrh on Geopedia

Populated places in the Municipality of Bistrica ob Sotli